Electromagnetic Field (also known as EMF, or EMF Camp) is a camping festival in the UK, held every two years, for hackers, geeks, engineers and scientists. It features talks and workshops covering a wide variety of topics. EMF is a non-profit event run entirely by a team of volunteers.

Attendees of EMF receive an electronic conference badge, funded by sponsorship, which in 2014 included an LCD screen, Arduino-compatible microcontroller, and a radio transceiver.

History

The first Electromagnetic Field event was held in 2012 at Pineham in Milton Keynes, and completely sold out a 499-person capacity. Each tent at EMF 2012 was provided with power and the internet, via a 2.5 km direct microwave link to a data centre which provided 370 Mbit/s to the campsite. Over 50 speakers gave talks, including Ben Goldacre.

In 2013, a smaller interim one-day event called Electromagnetic Wave was held in London on board the MS Stubnitz.

The main event was held again in 2014 at Hounslow Hall Estate, Newton Longville (near Milton Keynes). Over 1,200 tickets were sold. As with the 2012 event, internet was provided by a direct microwave link which provided 436 Mbit/s. The entire event had over 100 talks, workshops and events with a separate track for children. Notable speakers included Tom Watson MP and Simon Singh. In addition there were 45 'villages' that ran their own workshops and events including silver smithing, wood turning and making stroopwafels.

Electromagnetic Field 2016 was held on 5–7 August 2016 at Loseley Park, Guildford with an attendance of over 1,600. The 1 Gbit/s internet connection was provided by fibre, and the on-site network had a 10 Gbit/s backbone.

Electromagnetic Field 2018 was held on 31 August – 2 September 2018 at Eastnor Castle Deer Park, Herefordshire. The attendance was 2,500.

Electromagnetic Field 2020 was due to be held on 24–26 July 2020, again at Eastnor Castle Deer Park, Herefordshire. However the event was cancelled due to the ongoing COVID-19 pandemic.

List of events

Synchronization with other events

In the years when Electromagnetic Field does not occur, Chaos Communication Camp (in Germany) and one of the Hack-Tic hacker events (in the Netherlands) occur alternately.

References

External links
Official website
Recordings of talks from 2014
Recordings of talks from 2016
Recordings of talks from 2018

2012 establishments in England
Counterculture festivals
Hacker conventions
Recurring events established in 2012